Giorgos, Yiorgos or Yorgos is a common abbreviation of the given name Georgios. Notable people with the name include:

Persons

Giorgos

 Giorgos Agorogiannis, Greek footballer
 Giorgos Alkaios, pop musician and singer
 Giorgos Anatolakis, Greek footballer
 Giorgos Angelopoulos, Greek businessman and billionaire
 Giorgos Apostolidis, Greek basketball player
 Giorgos Arvanitis (born 1941), Greek cinematographer
 Giorgos Balogiannis, Greek basketball player
 Giorgos Bartzokas, Greek basketball coach
 Giorgos Batis, Greek rebetiko musician
 Giorgos Dedes, Greek footballer
 Giorgos Diamantopoulos, Greek basketball player
 Giorgos Dimitrakopoulos (born 1952), Greek politician and Member of the European Parliament
 Giorgos Donis, Greek footballer
 Giorgos Economides, Cypriot footballer
 Giorgos Foiros, Greek footballer and manager
 Giorgos Fotakis, Greek footballer
 Giorgos Gasparis, Greek basketball player
 Giorgos Gavriilidis (1906–1982), Greek actor
 Giorgos Georgiadis, Greek footballer
 Giorgos Giannias (died 1821), Greek revolutionary leader
 Giorgos Iacovou, Cypriot diplomat and politician
 Giorgos Kalaitzis, Greek basketball player
 Giorgos Kapoutzidis, Greek scriptwriter and actor
 Giorgos Karagounis, Greek footballer
 Giorgos Karagoutis, Greek basketball player
 Giorgos Kastrinakis, Greek-American basketball player
 Giorgos Katsaros (born 1934), Greek musician and composer
 Giorgos Kolokithas, Greek basketball player
 Giorgos Koltzos, Greek footballer
 Giorgos Konstadinou (born 1934), Greek actor and director
 Giorgos Kostikos, Greek footballer
 Giorgos Koudas, Greek footballer

 Giorgos Markopoulos, Greek poet
 Giorgos Mazonakis, Greek pop singer
 Giorgos Merkis, Cypriot footballer
 Giorgos Mitsibonas, Greek footballer
 Giorgos Nicolaou, Cypriot footballer
 Giorgos Ninios, Greek actor 
 Giorgos Paligiorgos, Greek footballer
 Giorgos Panagi, Cypriot footballer
 Giorgos Papasideris (1902–1977), Greek country singer, composer and lyricist
 Giorgos Patis, Greek badminton player
 Giorgos Pelagias, Cypriot footballer
 Giorgos Poniros, Greek footballer
 Giorgos Samaras, Greek footballer
 Giorgos Savvidis, Greek footballer
 Giorgos Seferis (1900–1971), Greek writer, Nobel Prize in Literature laureate 
 Giorgos Siantos, Greek resistance member and politician
 Giorgos Sideris, Greek footballer
 Giorgos Sigalas, Greek basketball player
 Giorgos Skartados, Greek footballer
 Giorgos Sterianopoulos, Greek businessman
 Giorgos Theodoridis, Greek footballer
 Giorgos Theodotou, Greek footballer
 Giorgos Theofanous (born 1968), Cypriot-Greek composer
 Giorgos Tofas, Cypriot footballer
 Giorgos Toursounidis, Greek footballer
 Giorgos Toussas, Greek politician and Member of the European Parliament
 Giorgos Tsalikis, Greek pop singer
 Giorgos Tsiaras, Greek basketball player
 Giorgos Tzavelas, Greek footballer
 Giorgos Tzavellas, Greek film director and screenwriter
 Giorgos Vaitsis, Greek footballer
 Giorgos Vassilakopoulos, President of FIBA Europe
 Giorgos Velentzas, Greek actor
 Giorgos Zampetas, Greek songwriter and musician

Yiorgos
Yiorgos Batis (1885–1967), Greek musician, influential in rebetiko music
Yiorgos Caralambo, camel driver hired by US Army in 1856 for the Camel Corps experiment in the Southwest
Yiorgos Depollas, Greek photographer
Yiorgos Magoulas, Greek composer and guitarist
Yiorgos Vardinogiannis, Greek shipowner and businessman, former owner and president of the Panathinaikos football club

Yorgos 
 Yorgos Lanthimos, Greek film producer and director
 Yorgos Dalaras, Greek Singer
 Yorgos Mavropsaridis, Greek film editor

Songs about Giorgos
"Giorgo pou xereis ta polla" (Giorgos, the know-it-all) by Dimitris Mitropanos
"Me lene Giorgo" (My name is Giorgos) sung by Manolis Mitsias, written by Giorgos Hatzinasios
"Aftos o Giorgos" (This Giorgos) by

See also

George (given name)

Greek masculine given names